A Girl of the Bush is a 1921 Australian silent film directed by Franklyn Barrett. It is one of the few films from Barrett to survive in its entirety today.

Plot
Lorna Denver manages Kangaroo Flat sheep station and is pursued by two men, evil Oswald and handsome young surveyor, Tom Wilson.

Lorna gives shelter to a baby that has survived an attack by aboriginals, but Tom thinks the baby is hers. This upsets Lorna who breaks it off with him.

Oswald is murdered and Tom is arrested. A Chinese cook reveals that the real killer was the father of a woman who had been seduced by Oswald.

Cast
Vera James as Lorna Denver
Jack Martin as Tom Wilson
Herbert Linden as Oswald Keane
Stella Southern as Grace Girton
James Martin as John Burns
Sam Warr as Sing Lee
Emma Shea as Looe Toe
D. L. Dalziel as James Keane
Gerald Harcourt as Reg Howard
Olga Broughton as Mary Burns
Mick Huntsdale as Bill Tresle
Tom Cosgrove as Bill's mate

Production
The script was heavily influenced by the plays The Squatter's Daughter and On Our Selection.

This was the first of three films Barrett made for his own company. Shooting began in October 1920 at the Fremantle Station near Bathurst.

Reception
The film was widely distributed and appears to have been a success at the box office.

Vera James' father bought the rights to distribute the film in New Zealand.

References

External links

A Girl of the Bush at the National Film and Sound Archive
A Girl of the Bush: Representations of Rural Women in Australian Silent and Early Sound Film by Anna Gardner

1921 films
Australian drama films
Australian black-and-white films
Australian silent feature films
1921 drama films
Films directed by Franklyn Barrett
Silent drama films
1920s English-language films